Peter St. John (Jan. 11, 1726, Norwalk, Connecticut-Jan. 4, 1811, Walton, New York) was an American poet and schoolteacher from Norwalk, CT who supported the Patriot cause during the American Revolution.

Works
St. John’s better-known poems included The Death of Abel, An Historical or rather a Conjectural Poem; Relating many things which might probably take place both Before and After that Barbarous Fratricide (1793) and American Taxation (1765), new lyrics set to the well-known colonial tune The British Grenadiers.

Imprisonment
On July 22, 1781, St. John was among forty-eight congregants captured when Tories surrounded the Congregation Church in present-day Darien, CT.  St. John and the others including the church’s revered pastor Moses Mather were made to walk to Long Island Sound, where they were loaded onto a ship bound for Lloyds Neck, Long Island where they were held in cruel, filthy conditions.  Thereafter, half of the prisoners, St. John included, were sent to New York where they were paraded through the streets before a jeering crowd to be held in the Provost Prison as prisoners of war.  St. John was imprisoned until the end of December, 1781 when was freed along with the eighteen other survivors in a prisoner exchange.  The incident became the basis for St. John’s poem Descent on Middlesex, a Poetical Relation of the Capture of the Congregation at Middlesex...with an Account of their Sufferings & c. while in captivity.

See also
United States poetry
List of poets from the United States

References

External links
 Descent on Middlesex (full text of 1781 poem)

American male poets
Writers from Norwalk, Connecticut
American Revolutionary War prisoners of war held by Great Britain